Manjinder Singh is a lieutenant general in the Indian Army who took the office as the General Officer Commanding, XVI Corps in October 2021. Prior to this appointment, he served as the Chief of Staff, Western Command. and as MGGS (Ops) at Headquarters, Western Command. He has also served as an instructor at the Indian Military Academy and Indian Military Training Team. He is the present Colonel of the Madras Regiment.

Biography 
Lt. General Manjinder Singh is an alumnus of Sainik School, Kapurthala, National Defence Academy and the Indian Military Academy, Dehradun. He was commissioned into 19th Battalion of the Madras Regiment on 20 December 1986  He obtained other military courses from various institutions such as Defence Services Staff College, Higher Command and National Defence College of Thailand.

He was also appointed as a commanding officer for Insurgency in Jammu and Kashmir, infantry brigade at the Line of Control (LOC) and an Infantry Division of Strike Corps.

Distinctions 
In 2015, he was awarded Yudh Seva Medal and the Vishisht Seva Medal in 2019.

References 

Living people
Indian generals
Sainik School alumni
National Defence Academy (India) alumni
Indian Military Academy alumni
Defence Services Command and Staff College graduates
Recipients of the Yudh Seva Medal
Recipients of the Vishisht Seva Medal
Year of birth missing (living people)
Defence Services Staff College alumni